This is a list of films produced in Pakistan in 2004 (see 2004 in film) and in the Urdu language.

2004

See also
2004 in Pakistan

External links
 Search Pakistani film - IMDB.com

2004
Pakistani
Films